Aaron Harry Gorson (2 June 1872 in Kovno, Russian Empire – 11 October 1933 in New York City) was an American artist.

Life
He immigrated to the United States, in Philadelphia, in 1888.
He studied at the Pennsylvania Academy of Fine Arts, in 1894–1896 and 1897–1898, where he studied with Thomas Anshutz. 
He studied at the Académie Julian, in 1900, École des Beaux-Arts, and Académie Colarossi.

His work appeared in the 1902 exhibition of the Pennsylvania Academy of Fine Arts.
He moved to Pittsburgh.
In 1921, he moved to New York City.

His work is in the Carnegie Museum of Art, Kresge Art Museum, the Westmoreland Museum of American Art,  the Newark Museum, the Worcester Art Museum, the Heckscher Museum of Art, and the Pennsylvania State University Art Gallery.

His scrapbooks are microfilmed at the Archives of American Art.

References

External links

http://www.christies.com/LotFinder/lot_details.aspx?intObjectID=5477523
https://web.archive.org/web/20120415050125/http://www.edenhurstgallery.com/painting.php?id=546
https://web.archive.org/web/20111221005137/http://aradergalleries.com/detail.php?id=2591

American artists
1872 births
1933 deaths
Artists from Kaunas
Emigrants from the Russian Empire to the United States
Pennsylvania Academy of the Fine Arts alumni
American alumni of the École des Beaux-Arts
Académie Julian alumni
Académie Colarossi alumni